Betson is a surname. Notable people with the surname include:

 Kevin Betson (1929–2012), Australian footballer
 Norm Betson (1914–1988), Australian footballer

See also
 Bateson, surname
 Batson, surname
 Beatson, surname